Vilson Xavier de Menezes Júnior (born 3 April 1989 in São Gonçalo, Rio de Janeiro), simply known as Vilson, is a Brazilian footballer who plays as a central defender, most recently for Corinthians.

Statistics

Honours 
Palmeiras
Campeonato Brasileiro Série B: 2013

Corinthians
Campeonato Brasileiro Série A: 2017
Campeonato Paulista: 2017

External links
 palmeiras.com.br
 CBF
 zerozero.pt
 Guardian Stats Centre
 websoccerclub
 netvasco.com.br
 crvascodagama

1989 births
Living people
Brazilian footballers
Campeonato Brasileiro Série A players
Campeonato Brasileiro Série B players
Madureira Esporte Clube players
CR Vasco da Gama players
Esporte Clube Vitória players
Grêmio Foot-Ball Porto Alegrense players
Sociedade Esportiva Palmeiras players
Cruzeiro Esporte Clube players
Associação Atlética Ponte Preta players
Associação Chapecoense de Futebol players
Association football defenders
People from São Gonçalo, Rio de Janeiro
Sportspeople from Rio de Janeiro (state)